The HTC Desire SV is a brand of Android smartphone, manufactured by HTC Corporation.

References

External links
 HTC India

Desire SV
Android (operating system) devices
Discontinued smartphones